The Mundaring and Hills Historical Society (MHHS) is a local history society for the Shire of Mundaring, based in Mundaring, Western Australia.

Affiliated with the Royal Western Australian Historical Society, the Society is a vital conduit for the disparate heritage and history issues in the Shire area. In earlier times a group of scattered communities linked by the railway branches that now constitutes the Railway Reserve Heritage Trail.

Overview
The Mundaring and Hills Historical Society was formed in 1989. Prior to this historical and heritage issues in the Hills region saw significant losses of information, and loss of details of people and properties.  The Society has corrected this, being able to attract significant funding and patronage to maintain a museum and to collect a wide range of materials and information. It is also one of the organisations heavily involved in the annual Trek the Trail that utilises sections of the Railway Reserve Heritage Trail as an outdoor event.

The Mundaring and Hills Historical Society was a finalist in the 2011 Western Australian Heritage Awards.

Projects
Projects that the Mundaring and Hills Historical Society have been involved in include:               
 Childow Proclamation Train Sculpture 2004 – to mark the 175th anniversary of Western Australia and Proclamation Day 2004. Chidlow was the last stopping point, prior to entering Perth, for the WA Governor's train carrying WA's first constitution in 1890. The MHHS was successful in obtaining a grant for the purpose of marking this event.
 Parkerville Roll of Honour Restoration 2004 – Restoration was made possible via a grant from the ANZAC Day Working Group's Small Grant Scheme and with a significant contribution by the local Ratepayers and Residents Group. Mundaring and Hills Historical Society researched the Roll and were able to provide new insights into the men honoured on the roll.

Publications

Mundaring District Museum
The Society has its operational headquarters in a heritage property –  the brick and iron Mundaring Station Master's House.  The Society also operates a museum in the former Mundaring School building, known as the Mundaring District Museum.

References

External links
  Official website

History of Western Australia
Mundaring, Western Australia
Historical societies of Australia
1989 establishments in Australia